Tabulda (Tabıldı) is a rural locality (a village) in Kundryaksky Selsoviet, Sterlibashevsky District, Bashkortostan, Russia. The population was 306 as of 2010. There are 4 streets.

Geography 
Tabulda is located 22 km southeast of Sterlibashevo (the district's administrative centre) by road. Kundryak is the nearest rural locality.

References 

Rural localities in Sterlibashevsky District